A "buffer shot" is a film technique of inserting a shot into a film to disguise a mistake, or a cut. Buffer shots are often known as "cheat shots."

For example, if Character A is talking to Character B and the microphone is briefly in shot while Character A is talking, the editor could insert a shot of Character B listening or reacting, to cover up the mistake. This technique is often used in news reporting when there is no opportunity for re-takes, or to cover up cuts in an interview.

See also
 Noddy (TV interview technique)

Cinematography